Kanwar Rai Singh  (24 February 1922 – 12 November 1993) was an Indian cricketer who played in one Test match in 1948. A right-handed batsman, Rai Singh was a surprise selection for the Indian tour of Australia in 1947–48. During his career, which spanned from 1940 until 1961, Rai Singh scored 1,778 runs in first-class cricket at an average of 30.13, scoring four centuries and seven half-centuries.

See also
One Test Wonder

References

1922 births
1993 deaths
India Test cricketers
Indian cricketers
Services cricketers
Southern Punjab cricketers
North Zone cricketers
The Rest cricketers
Cricketers from Himachal Pradesh